Barberitos is a franchise restaurant chain of Mission burrito-inspired restaurants based in Athens, Georgia, United States. , 50 Barberitos restaurants were operating in seven southeastern United States. The company name is a portmanteau of Downing Barber, company founder, and burrito, a signature item at Barberitos restaurants. The company mascot is Pepe, a grinning chili pepper wearing dark glasses and clutching a burrito. 

The idea of the restaurant developed when Barber tried eating a healthy diet without a budget, while noticing a restaurant in Aspen, Colorado serving fresh food to customers. After realizing his dissatisfaction with working in a corporate career, he decided to pursue building a restaurant in Athens. At first, the business struggled, then skyrocketed after a football game between University of Georgia and University of Tennessee. On February 20, 2020, Barberitos celebrated its 20th anniversary.  

The original Barberitos in downtown Athens opened in 2000. Franchising for the company began in 2002. In 2019, NFL player and UGA alum David Pollack joined Barberitos as the brand's ambassador.

References

External links

Companies based in Athens, Georgia
Restaurants in Georgia (U.S. state)
Economy of the Southeastern United States
Regional restaurant chains in the United States
Fast-food chains of the United States
Fast-food Mexican restaurants
Fast-food franchises
Fast casual restaurants
2000 establishments in Georgia (U.S. state)